The Fox Broadcasting Company (Fox) is an American broadcast television network that was launched in October 1986. Throughout its history, the network has many owned-and-operated and affiliated stations.

This article is a table listing of former Fox stations, arranged alphabetically by state, and based on the station's city of license as well as its Designated Market Area; it is also accompanied by footnotes regarding the present network affiliation of the former Fox-affiliated station (if the station remains operational) and the current Fox affiliates in each of the listed markets, as well as any other notes including the reasons behind each station's disaffiliation from the network. There are links to and articles on each of the stations, describing their histories, local programming and technical information, such as broadcast frequencies.

The station's advertised channel number follows the call letters. In most cases, this is their virtual channel (PSIP) number, which may match the channel allocation that the station originally broadcast on during its prior affiliation with the network.

Former affiliate stations
Stations are listed in alphabetical order by city of license.

See also
 List of Fox television affiliates (by U.S. state)
 List of Fox television affiliates (table)

References

Fox